Meatless Tuesday is a 1943 Andy Panda cartoon produced by Walter Lantz Productions. It was directed by James Culhane and was released on October 25, 1943. It is the second and last cartoon to pair Andy with Charlie Chicken.

The title is a reference to Meatless Monday, which is a popular campaign during World War II that encourages people to save and ration meat for the war effort.

Plot
Taking place entirely in pantomime, Andy Panda is going through a cookbook looking for something to prepare on a Meatless Tuesday when he hears a rooster crow outside, asking him to have roast chicken for supper, but the farmyard rooster isn't cooperating. Andy pursues the rooster to a chicken coop, where he locks himself inside. He tries a few other methods to get the rooster out, like using bird seeds and prying the coop door open, but none of them appear to work. Andy then uses a shovel to dig his way into the coop, but the rooster and the other hens repositioned the coop above a fountain, leading Andy to be splashed out of the earth and into his cellar.

Andy emerges from the cellar with an axe and begins chasing the rooster once more. He eventually catches up with him and prepares to sever his head from his neck, but he hesitates. The rooster responds by blindfolding  Andy, who then proceeds to hack off his head. The axe blade, however, flies away from the handle and lands in the rooster's neck. With the upper hand, the rooster pursues Andy up a telephone pole, which he then chops down into Andy's garden. The rooster lets out another crow, and the hens around him applaud him, only to be whacked with a tomato by Andy in return.

Home media
Walter Lantz Presents: The World of Andy Panda (VHS; Universal/MCA)
Woody Woodpecker and Friends: Volume 6 (DVD; Columbia House)

Analysis
Meatless Tuesday is the first Andy Panda short directed by James "Shamus" Culhane. Culhane himself was uninterested of Andy's character at the time, describing him as "too goddamn sweet and cuddly" in his autobiography, Talking Animals and Other People, and preferred to direct the cartoon in a break-neck pace compared to Alex Lovy more sluggish pacing in his cartoons. This is also the second to last cartoon to star Charlie Chicken. Although unnamed in this short, Charlie would be a prominent sidekick to Andy in the Andy Panda comic series.

References

External links

Animated films without speech
1943 animated films
1943 films
1940s American animated films
Andy Panda films
Films directed by James Culhane